The 2000–01 Liechtenstein Cup was the fifty-sixth season of Liechtenstein's annual cup competition. Seven clubs competed with a total of fifteen teams for one spot in the qualifying round of the UEFA Cup. Defending champions were FC Vaduz, who have won the cup continuously since 1998.

First round

|colspan="3" style="background-color:#99CCCC; text-align:center;"|17 October 2000

|-
|colspan="3" style="background-color:#99CCCC; text-align:center;"|18 October 2000

|}

Quarterfinals 

|colspan="3" style="background-color:#99CCCC; text-align:center;"|7 November 2000

|-
|colspan="3" style="background-color:#99CCCC; text-align:center;"|8 November 2000

|}

Semifinals 

|colspan="3" style="background-color:#99CCCC; text-align:center;"|14 March 2001

|-
|colspan="3" style="background-color:#99CCCC; text-align:center;"|3 April 2001

|}

Final

External links 
Official site of the LFV
RSSSF page

Liechtenstein Football Cup seasons
Cup
Liechtenstein Cup